Redback, Red Back or Red-back may refer to:

Sports
 Southern Redbacks, nickname for the West End Redbacks, the South Australia cricket team based in Adelaide 
 Frankfurt Redbacks, Australian rules football club based in Frankfurt, Germany
 Glasgow Redbacks, Australian rules football club based in Glasgow, Scotland
 Redbacks, nickname for the Romsey Football Club, Australian rules football club based in Romsey, Victoria, Australia

Finance
 Texas redbacks, paper money issued between 1839 and 1840 in the Republic of Texas
 The Australian twenty dollar note, sometimes referred to as a redback
 The Renminbi, the Chinese currency is sometimes referred to as redback in contrast to US dollar

Other uses
 Redback Aviation, an Australian aircraft manufacturer
 Redback spider (Latrodectus hasselti), species of spider found in Australia
 Airborne Redback, Australian ultralight trike aircraft
 Redback Boots, Australian footwear manufacturing company
 Redback Networks, telecommunications equipment company
 Redback (comics), a comic book superhero
 Redback (film)